Puigcerdà is the capital of the Catalan comarca of Cerdanya, in the province of Girona, Catalonia, northern Spain, near the Segre River and on the border with France (it abuts directly onto the French town of Bourg-Madame).

History 
Puigcerdà is located near the site of a Ceretani settlement, which was incorporated into Roman territory. The Roman town was named Julia Libyca.

Puigcerdà was founded in 1178 by King Alfonso I of Aragon, Count of Barcelona. In 1178 Puigcerdà replaced Hix as the capital of Cerdanya. Hix is now a village in the commune of Bourg-Madame, in the French part of Cerdagne.

In the closing stages of the 1672-1678 Franco-Dutch War, the town was captured by a French army under the duc de Noailles but returned to Spain in the Treaties of Nijmegen. 

Puigcerdà was unique during the Spanish Civil War in having a democratically elected Anarchist council.

The Portet-Saint-Simon–Puigcerdà railway was opened in 1929, crossing the Pyrenees to France.

Main sights
Puigcerdà Pool
Torre del Campanar (12th century). It is the last remain of a parish church destroyed in 1936
Romanesque church of Sant Tomàs de Ventajola, known from 958
Romanesque church of Sant Andreu Vilallobent, dating to the 10th century and later restored
Convent of St. Dominic, founded in 1291 and finished in the 15th century
Old Hospital (1190), in Romanesque-Gothic style

Notable people 
 Pere Borrell del Caso (1835-1910), painter
 Gemma Arró Ribot (born 1980), ski mountaineer
 José Antonio Hermida (born 1978), World Champion Cross Country Mountain bike 2010

References

External links

 Government data pages 

Municipalities in Cerdanya (comarca)
1177 establishments in Europe
Municipalities in the Province of Girona
France–Spain border crossings
Populated places in the Province of Girona
12th-century establishments in Spain